Raja Chaudhary (born 23 July 1975) is an Indian television actor, writer and producer based in Mumbai. He predominantly works in the Bhojpuri cinema. In 2008, Chaudhary participated as a contestant on Colors TV's reality show Bigg Boss, where he emerged as the first runner up.

Career
Chaudhary played a villain role in the Bhojpuri film Saiyyan Hamar Hindustani opposite Shweta Tiwari. He gained fame during his stint at the Hindi reality show Bigg Boss 2 where he was a runner up. He then participated in another reality show Zor Ka Jhatka: Total Wipe Out.

Chaudhary has also acted in many television serials Your Honour, Daddy Samjha Karo, Chandramukhi, Aane Wala Pal, period Indian fantasy series Kahani Chandrakanta Ki and Adaalat . He was also featured in a TV serial called Black (loosely based on Hollywood Omen) on 9X Channel, directed by Sunil Agnihotri.

Personal life
Chaudhary is an alumnus of Asian Academy of Film & Television. He married television actress, Shweta Tiwari in 1998, the couple had a daughter together, Palak Tiwari. The couple featured together in season 2 of the reality dance show, Nach Baliye. The couple later separated after Tiwari filed for divorce in 2007 ending their 9 years in marriage. In 2015, he married Shveta Sood, a Delhi based corporate professional.

Filmography

Films

Television

References

Indian male television actors
1975 births
Living people
Male actors from Uttar Pradesh
21st-century Indian male actors
People from Meerut
Bigg Boss (Hindi TV series) contestants